Cupid's Fireman is a 1923 American silent action drama film directed by William A. Wellman and produced and distributed by Fox Film Corporation.

Plot
As described in a film magazine review, fireman Andy McGee adopts a little orphan girl after the death of his mother. He falls in love with chorus girl Agnes Evans who has a brutal husband. The house where Agnes lives catches fire, and the fire department responds by dispatching Andy's fire brigade. Andy saves Agnes and then attempts to save her drunken husband, but the floor collapses beneath him and he dies. Agnes and Andy are then united.

Cast

References

External links
 
 

Films directed by William A. Wellman
1920s action films
1923 adventure films
Lost American films
1923 romantic drama films
American romantic drama films
Fox Film films
American black-and-white films
American silent feature films
Films about firefighting
Films based on short fiction
1920s American films
Silent romantic drama films
Silent adventure films
Silent American drama films